The winding, hillside road from Tantalus to Round Top in Honolulu, Hawaii, dates back to 1892. Tantalus Drive and Round Top Drive were gravel roads when they were completed in 1917, but were paved in 1937. In March 2007, a seven-mile stretch of the road was added to the State Register of Historic Places, and in August 2009 to the National Register of Historic Places, the first such designation for a roadway on Oahu. The more populated lower portions of Tantalus Drive and Round Top Drive were not so designated. This road joins the Hana Highway on Maui on the National Register, and 97 such Historic Roads nationally. Not all of the latter are on the National Register, but some are listed among the Federal Highway Administration's National Scenic Byways or All-American Roads.

Gallery

References

Roads on the National Register of Historic Places in Hawaii
Transportation in Honolulu County, Hawaii
Historic trails and roads in Hawaii